Buzz Songs is the second full-length album by Dragon Ash; released in 1998.

Buzz Songs is the first full-length album where Dragon Ash member DJ BOTS can be found supplying scratch and beat samples to several of the songs, before he officially joined in 1999.

Track listing
"Intro (Bots' Show)" – 1:24 
"Cool Boarders" – 4:27 
"Don't Worry 'bout Me" – 4:28 
"Cherub Rock" – 3:29 
"Invitation (Buzz Mix)" – 2:58 
"Under Age's Song (Album Mix)" – 7:10 
"Perfect Government" – 5:20 
"Pull Up Roots" – 3:56 
"Melancholy" – 4:20 
"Mustang A Go Go !!!" – 4:35 
"陽はまたのぼりくりかえす" (Hi wa Mata Noborikuri Kaesu) – 8:12
"Iceman" (hidden track) – 4:46

References

1998 albums
Dragon Ash albums
Victor Entertainment albums